Luděk Bohman (born 2 December 1946 in Nymburk) is a Czech former athlete who competed in the 1972 Summer Olympics.

He is the father of sprinter Ludvík Bohman and bobsledder Martin Bohman.

References 

1946 births
Living people
Czech male sprinters
Czechoslovak male sprinters
Olympic athletes of Czechoslovakia
Athletes (track and field) at the 1972 Summer Olympics
People from Nymburk
Sportspeople from the Central Bohemian Region